Gastropholis vittata also known as the keelbelly ground lizard, is a species of lizard found in Tanzania, Mozambique, and Kenya.

References

Gastropholis
Reptiles described in 1886
Taxa named by Johann Gustav Fischer